Grove City College (GCC) is a private, conservative Christian liberal arts college in Grove City, Pennsylvania. Founded in 1876 as a normal school, the college emphasizes a humanities core curriculum and offers 60 majors and 6 pre-professional programs with undergraduate degrees in the liberal arts, sciences, business, education, engineering, and music. Though once associated with the Presbyterian Church, the college is now unaffiliated.

History

Founding
Founded in 1876 by Isaac C. Ketler, the school was originally chartered as Pine Grove Normal Academy. It had twenty-six students in its first year. In 1884, the trustees of Pine Grove Normal Academy in Grove City amended the academy charter to change the name to Grove City College. By charter, the doors of the College were open to qualified students "without regard to religious test or belief." Isaac Ketler served as president until 1913.

Grove City was also supported by Joseph Newton Pew, founder of the Sun Oil Company. Pew and Ketler's sons, Weir C. Ketler and John Howard Pew, later went on to become Grove City president and president of the board of trustees, respectively. During the summer of 1925, J. Gresham Machen gave the lectures that formed the basis of his book, What Is Faith?

World War II
As World War II began, Grove City College was one of six schools selected by the United States Navy to participate in the highly unusual Electronics Training Program (ETP). Starting March 1942, each month a new group of 100 Navy and Marine students arrived for three months of 14-hour days in concentrated electrical engineering study. ETP admission required passing the Eddy Test, one of the most selective qualifying exams given during the war years. Professor Russell P. Smith was the program's Director of Instruction. By the fall of 1943, there were only 81 civilian men in the student body; thus, the presence of 300 or so servicemen contributed greatly in sustaining the College. This training at Grove City continued until April 1945; library records show that there were 49 classes graduating 3,759 persons.

Supreme Court case

Under President Dr. Charles S. MacKenzie, the college was the plaintiff-appellee in the landmark U.S. Supreme Court case in 1984, Grove City College v. Bell. The ruling came seven years after the school's refusal to sign a Title IX compliance form, which would have subjected the entire school to federal regulations, even ones not yet issued. The court ruled 6–3 that acceptance by students of federal educational grants fell under the regulatory requirements of Title IX, but it limited the application to the school's financial aid department.

In 1988, new legislation subjected every department of any educational institution that received federal funding to Title IX requirements. In response, Grove City College withdrew from the Pell Grant program entirely beginning with the 1988–89 academic year, replacing such grants to students with its own program, the Student Freedom Fund. In October 1996, the college withdrew from the Stafford Loan program, providing entering students with replacements through a program with PNC Bank.

Grove City is one of a handful of colleges (along with Hillsdale College, which did likewise after the aforementioned 1984 case) that does not allow its students to accept federal financial aid of any kind, including grants, loans and scholarships.

Recent history
From 1963 until 2016, the American Association of University Professors placed Grove City under censure for violations of tenure and academic freedom because of the dismissal of Professor of History and Political Science Dr. Larry Gara. By the end of this period, Grove City's administration was on the AAUP's list of censured administrations longer than any other college on the list. In its report, the AAUP Investigative Committee at Grove City concluded that "the absence of due process [in the dismissal of professors at Grove City] raises... doubts regarding the academic security of any persons who may hold appointment at Grove City College under existing administrative practice. These doubts are of an order of magnitude which obliges us to report them to the academic profession at large."  In 2013 Grove City started working to remove itself from the censure list.  Two years later, the school admitted that they would have handled Dr. Gara's case rather differently under their current procedures.  This led the AAUP to lift their sanction on the school at its annual meeting in 2016. Gara received an apology from the school in October 2015.

In 2005, Grove City founded the conservative think-tank the Center for Vision and Values In April 2019, it was renamed the Institute for Faith & Freedom, saying that it "more clearly aligns it with the historic values of the College."

In recent years, the college has engaged in many new construction projects, including an expansion to its music and arts center in 2002, a new academic building in 2003, a new student union/bookstore in 2004, and new apartment-style housing in 2006. Grove City's Student Union building was honored with the International Masonry Institute's Golden Trowel Grand Prize for excellence in masonry design and construction in 2005. On February 9, 2011 Grove City College announced that it would break ground for construction of a science, engineering and mathematics building – key components of Grove City Matters: A Campaign to Advance Grove City College, which at $90 million is the largest capital campaign in the college's history. The $37.2-million science, engineering and mathematics building is designed to support new modes of teaching, particularly flexible laboratories and small-group interactions. It will help ensure that Grove City College continues to prepare students for future careers in an increasingly competitive work force, officials said. STEM Hall was opened in August 2013 and provides laboratory space for students studying biology, chemistry, physics and computer science. In the summer of 2021, Grove City announced that the campus' Henry Buhl Library would be majorly renovated, with the addition of classroom space, updated study areas, and a cafe.

The college acquired an observatory from Edinboro University of Pennsylvania in February 2008 that will be used for astronomy classes as well as faculty and student research. The purchase of the property, three buildings and equipment inside will pave the way for the addition of an astronomy minor on campus. Through this observatory, the college's physics department plans to work with area public schools as well as other colleges and universities on educational and research projects and draw prospective students who are looking for strong physics programs and astronomy coursework.

Academics

Accreditation
Grove City offers 55 majors in the liberal arts, sciences and engineering. The college is accredited by the Middle States Commission on Higher Education. The college's electrical and computer and mechanical engineering programs are accredited by the Accreditation Board for Engineering and Technology, Inc. (ABET). Most recently, the Bachelor of Science in Social Work program was approved as a candidate for accreditation through the specialized accreditation offered through the Council on Social Work Education. IN 2019, Grove City announced a new partnership with Butler County Community College to provide a Bachelors of Science in Nursing degree.

Rankings
Grove City has an acceptance rate of 82.5%. The average GPA of entering freshmen is 3.70 in 2017. The average ACT score of the 2017 incoming freshman class was 26. The average SAT score of the 2017 incoming freshman class was 1231.

US News & World Report'''s 2020 college rankings place Grove City 120th among 233 "National Liberal Arts Colleges". Consumers Digest Magazine's Top 100 College Values ranks Grove City College, the top value in private liberal arts schools throughout the nation in May 2011.

Connections to think tanks
Although it is a small liberal arts college, Grove City's faculty and administrators significantly influence and impact the ideas of various think tanks around the USA especially on issues involving the environment, education, minimum wage, and anything economic and conservative. Grove City College has international ties, founded in 1955, and on the International Society for Individual Liberty (ISIL) Freedom Network.

The National Center for Neighborhood Enterprise an organization that seeks to provide effective community and faith-based organizations with training and technical assistance, links them to sources of support, and evaluates their experience for public policy to address the problems of youth violence, substance abuse, teen pregnancy, homelessness, joblessness, poor education and deteriorating neighborhoods, publicizes events held at Grove City College.

The Lone Mountain Coalition, part of the Property and Environment Research Center, which claims to be "America's oldest and largest institute dedicated to original research that brings market principles to resolving environmental problems", has ties to Grove City through Michael Coulter, Vice-President of the Shenango Institute for Public Policy, and associate professor of political science at Grove City College.

The college also has ties to the Ludwig von Mises Institute, a libertarian academic organization engaged in research and scholarship in the fields of economics, philosophy and political economy. Several members of the Mises Institute faculty are also faculty at Grove City. Jeffery Herbener is a senior fellow at the Ludwig von Mises Institute and professor of economics at Grove City College. Shawn Ritenour is an associate professor of economics at Grove City College and an associated scholar at the Mises Institute in Auburn, Alabama.

Grove City also has ties to Michigan through Lawrence W. (Larry) Reed, president of Michigan's Mackinac Center for Public Policy. Reed received his B.A. in Economics from Grove City in 1975. Reed is also past president of the State Policy Network.

The Academic Advisory Committee of the John Locke Foundation, a free market think tank in North Carolina, which supports the John William Pope Center for Higher Education Policy, a nonprofit institute dedicated to improving higher education in North Carolina and the nation, includes Dr. Walter E. Williams, the John M. Olin Distinguished Professor of Economics, George Mason University, holder of a Doctor of Humane Letters from Grove City College and John Moore, Former President of Grove City College, who led the college through its withdrawal from federal student loan programs, which completed the college's break from federal ties.

Academics
Students are required to take general requirements courses, with science, mathematics/reasoning, and several other courses. The base of the general requirements is centered around a humanities core, with courses on Western Civilization, Art, Literature, and Biblical Revelation. Requirements for majors differ, but typically a student is also required to take three foreign language classes and reach some mathematical proficiency. Many Grove City students take one to three general requirements classes in their freshman, sophomore, and sometimes junior years, along with classes for their respective major.

Many students choose Grove City explicitly for its Christian environment and traditional Humanities curriculum.  A three-year required Humanities sequence focuses on the origin, development and implications of civilization's seminal ideas and worldviews. The courses cover content that includes religion, philosophy, history and philosophy of science, literature, art and music. Because of its strong adherence to freedom and minimal government interference, Grove City College is considered to be one of America's foremost colleges that teach the ideas of the Austrian School of Economics. The post-1938 personal papers of Ludwig Von Mises, are housed in the archive of Grove City College. Grove City College also hosts the Austrian Student Scholars Conference. Annually done in February, a collection of students from around the United States present research papers on the history of economic thought or on current developments within the Austrian School of Thought. In addition to traditional business programs, Grove City also offers a degree in Entrepreneurship and a degree in Business Economics.

Policies and environment
When it opened, Grove City College was one of the first institutions of higher learning in the United States to admit both male and female students. The school currently maintains a one-to-one ratio of men to women, ensuring that the student body is approximately 50% men and 50% women.

Grove City College adopts a strong policy in regard to alcohol use on campus, with first time offenders receiving a one-week suspension from all activities. Legal age students are permitted to consume alcohol off campus, provided that they do not appear inebriated upon their return. Current student organizations must agree to a strong policy regarding alcohol use both on and off campus, their violation resulting in the loss of their charter.

In 2012, The Princeton Review listed Grove City College as the 2nd most LGBT-unfriendly school in the United States. Lacking the administrative will to address key factors driving the 2012 ranking, in 2013 Grove City landed at #1 in the Princeton Review’s rankings of most LGBT-unfriendly schools in the America. As of 2016, they are ranked 9th.

By refusing to accept federal funds and so-called Title IV financial aid (from the Higher Education Act of 1965), Grove City is not required to adhere to various federal guidelines that (i) prevent sex-based and many other forms of discrimination (e.g., Title IX of the Education Amendments of 1972), (ii) regulate investigations into accusations of sexual abuse, (iii) require the collecting and sharing of information about crimes on campus (Clery Act), and (iv) set standards for disciplinary proceedings (Campus Sexual Violence Elimination Act).

Religious facilities
Grove City College was initially affiliated with the Presbyterian Church, but it is no longer tied to a particular Christian denomination. Students are not required to sign a statement of faith, but they are required to attend a certain number of chapel services per semester, including during the COVID-19 pandemic.

Harbison Chapel has been the longstanding campus facility for Christian services. In 2012, Rathburn Hall was built to function as office space for chapel staff, meeting space for religious groups, and a lounge area for visiting speakers.

Groups and organizations
GCC hosts approximately 150 Student Organizations and Activities. Among them are:
 Orientation Board (OB) – welcomes the incoming students beginning on move-in day and throughout the year. The group also plans and holds numerous events the first week freshmen arrive on campus.
 Swing Dancing Club – Encourages the continuation of classic dance in the youth of today. 
 Student Government Association – acts as the primary communication link between the students and the administration. Members are elected by the student body.
 Wolverine Marching Band- one of the largest Division III Marching Bands in the country, this 150–175 member ensemble performs at home games, regional high school band festivals and parades, and has performed numerous times at the Magic Kingdom.
 Symphonic Orchestra – This 90 member student ensemble performs repertoire from a variety of genres including: classical, contemporary, opera, movie themes and pops. The group is composed of music majors and non majors and is directed by Dr. Jeffrey Tedford, D.M.A.
 Touring Choir – rehearses and performs a varying repertoire of choral music at locations throughout Western Pennsylvania and on its annual tour during spring break.
 Project Okello – the group's purpose is to be an instrument of hope, healing and Christ’s love to the people of Uganda through prayer and action.
 Crimson Collegiate Investors - the school's student managed fund that focuses on long-term value investing and teaching its members accordingly

Publications and media
 The Bridge – yearbook published in the fall.
 The Collegian – newspaper published weekly.
 The Echo – arts journal published in the spring and features student poetry, prose, fiction, photography and artwork.
 The Entrepreneur – promotes free market economics through student and faculty articles.
 The Journal of Law and Public Policy The Quad – magazine published quarterly and contains the written works of students, faculty, and alumni. Features creative nonfiction, book reviews, essays, fiction, and some poetry.

WSAJ radio

Assigned its call letters in April 1920, the Grove City College radio station, WSAJ-AM, was one of the first radio stations in the country. The call-letters were predated by experimental stations at the college dating back to 1914. In 1968, WSAJ-FM was put on the air and currently broadcasts at 91.1 MHz, functioning as a learning tool for all students, but especially those in the communication and engineering majors. The 100-watt AM station, operating from a longwire antenna on 1340 kHz, was one of the few remaining stations in the US to share time. It surrendered its broadcast license in 2006. The 1,600-watt FM signal covers a 30 mi radius in Western Pennsylvania. The station broadcasts fine arts programming, college football and basketball games. It also airs community events and high school sports. Students host weekly music shows during the evening hours when school is in session.

Fraternities, sororities, and housing groups
Fraternities and sororities live on campus, in pre-selected upperclassman halls. Grove City's fraternities and sororities are local and are not affiliated with any of the national Greek umbrella organizations. Many of the social fraternities and sororities were established in the early 1900s and are among the country's oldest local fraternities and sororities. Over the years, other sororities and one fraternity, Chi Delta Epsilon, have ceased to exist. The most recent sorority to become defunct was the short-lived Delta Chi Omega, which was founded in 1980 and lasted approximately one decade.  Sigma Sigma Sigma, founded in 1917, changed its name to Zeta Zeta Zeta (Tri-Zeta) in 1989 in response to threats of trademark infringement litigation from the national sorority Sigma Sigma Sigma.  Other fraternities and sororities have died out (meaning all their active members graduated or left the college) but have been reinstituted via block classes that assumed the organization's name, traditions and practices.

Both fraternities and sororities are overseen by governing bodies. The fraternities each send delegates to weekly meetings of the Interfraternity Council. The sororities' counterpart organization, the Grove City College Panhellenic Council, also meets each week. In the spring, the two councils hold joint meetings to plan the annual Greek Games. The Greek Games, a multi-day event which involved such activities as water balloon tossing and egg dropping, have declined in notoriety at Grove City College along with the size of Greek organizations; until the 1990s they were well-known on campus, with the majority of the student body either participating or spectating.  The annual All Campus Sing, formerly called Greek Sing, includes fraternities, sororities, housing groups, and independent groups and remains a popular competition occurring during the College's Family Weekend festivities each year.

Athletics

Grove City has been fielding athletics teams for over a century.  In 1906, they were one of the 39 charter members of the IAAUS, the forerunner of the NCAA.

Grove City College, known athletically as the Wolverines, competes in the Presidents' Athletic Conference (PAC) of NCAA Division III. On the varsity level, Grove City College has football, basketball, cross country, golf, soccer, cheerleading, swimming, tennis, and track teams for both men and women. Lacrosse, baseball, rugby union and football are varsity sports available to men only, while softball, and water polo are varsity sports offered to women only.  In April 2016, men's lacrosse was announced as the 22nd varsity sport and will begin in the 2018 spring season as a member of the Ohio River Lacrosse Conference (joint venture between presidents' Athletic Conference and Heartland Collegiate Athletic Conference).

Grove City also offers a number of club sports to men and women including but not limited to ultimate, and volleyball for men and field hockey, lacrosse, and rugby for women. These teams have been very successful, most notably the men's club volleyball team, which has finished in the top 10 in the country each of the last two years, the men's lacrosse team, which finished in the top 10 in the country in 2015, and both the men's and women's rugby teams which have been ranked in the top 10 in the country by the National Small College Rugby Organization.

Intramural sports for men are as follows: basketball, bowling, dodgeball, football, soccer, softball, table tennis, tennis, ultimate, and volleyball. Women have badminton, basketball, bowling, flag football, indoor soccer, kickball, racquetball, ultimate, and volleyball.

Grove City has several teams with remarkable PAC Championship records. Grove City's women's tennis team had won 25 consecutive PAC championships from 1987 through 2011 and the men's tennis team won 26 consecutive PAC championships between 1990 and 2016. In addition, the women's cross country team has won 27 consecutive PAC championships (1989–2015). The men's swim team also has 5 consecutive PAC championships, 2008–2012, while the women won 10 consecutive PAC championships from 2009 to 2018. Also notable is the overall swim team record of 61 consecutive winning seasons, from 1952 to 2012.

In 2018, the schools assistant sports information director was charged with nearly 100 counts for crimes ranging from privacy violations to possession of child pornography after it was discovered he had been secretly recording students who were showering in the college's locker room.

People
Notable alumni
 David M. Bailey – guitarist, singer-songwriter
 Jc Beall – analytic philosopher, logician, and analytic theologian. Holder of the O'Neill Family Chair of Philosophy, Notre Dame. Author of Logical Pluralism (Oxford: 2004), Spandrels of Truth (Oxford: 2009), Formal Theories of Truth (Oxford: 2018), and pioneer of Contradictory Christology in The Contradictory Christ (Oxford: 2021).
 Peter Boettke – professor of economics at George Mason University and editor of the Review of Austrian Economics
 Edward D. Breen – corporate CEO
 Alejandro Chafuen – author, president and former CEO of Atlas Network
 Larry Critchfield – Former NFL player
 Arthur Schwab – U.S. federal district court judge and GCC adjunct professor
 Jim Van Eerden – entrepreneur, brand strategist, media producer, co-founder of Helixx Partners, LLC
 George Clark Southworth – engineer and physicist who helped discover waveguides, recipient of the IEEE Medal of Honor (1963)
 R.J. Bowers – NFL football player, NCAA all-time rushing leader until October 2007.
 Scott Bullock – senior attorney and founding member of Institute For Justice
 Bill Deasy – singer-songwriter, author of the novel Ransom Seaborn (winner of the 2006 Needle Award for best novel) and former lead singer of the popular Pittsburgh-area band 'The Gathering Field'
 Burdette "Bob" Glenn – professional baseball player and highway engineer
 Scott Hahn – author, Roman Catholic theologian and apologist. Professor of Theology at the Franciscan University of Steubenville
 Matt Kibbe – current President of Free the People and former president and CEO of FreedomWorks
 Mose Lantz – Former NFL player
 Brian Leftow – theistic and analytic philosopher. Holder of the Nolloth Chair in the Philosophy of Religion, Oriel College, Oxford University. Author of Time and Eternity'' (1991) and over fifty papers in philosophy of religion, metaphysics, and the history of medieval philosophy.
 Paul McNulty – former U.S. Deputy Attorney General and President of Grove City College
 Gary Peters – former MLB player who played for the Boston Red Sox and Chicago White Sox, earned Chicago White Sox All-Century Team honors
 Joseph Howard Pew – founder and former president of Sun Oil Company
 David J. Porter – judge on the United States Court of Appeals for the Third Circuit
Nicholas Ranjan, District Judge, United States District Court for the Western District of Pennsylvania
 Lawrence Reed president of the Foundation for Economic Education (FEE)
 Sean W. Rowe – Bishop of the Episcopal Diocese of Northwestern PA
 Tiffany Seitz – Miss Pennsylvania 2020
 Spike Shannon – former professional baseball player who played with the St. Louis Cardinals, New York Giants and Pittsburgh Pirates. The National League leader in runs scored in 1907 with the New York Giants
 Frank Smith – MLB player, nicknamed "Piano Mover" 
 Frank Soday – Chemist influential in the development of alternative uses for synthetic fiber
 Greg Urbas – Hall of Fame wrestling coach
 Harold Willis Dodds – 15th president of Princeton University
 Howard Edward Winklevoss, Jr. – American actuary, academic and entrepreneur who has a practice in benefits management.

Notable professors
 G.K. Beale – Reformed theologian and author
 T. David Gordon – theologian of the New Testament and media ecologist
 Guillermo Gonzalez – astrophysicist, proponent of Intelligent Design
 Joshua F. Drake (former) – musicologist and hymnist
 Richard G. Jewell – former president of Grove City College and former Pittsburgh director of Navigant Consulting Inc.
 Paul Kengor – author, executive director of Grove City College's Center for Vision and Values
 Paul McNulty – President of Grove City College and Former Deputy Attorney General of the United States
 Hans Sennholz – economist, proponent of the Austrian school of economics, student of Ludwig von Mises
 Warren Throckmorton – professor of psychology
 Carl Trueman – Reformed theologian and historian
 Walter E. Williams – author, professor and former Chairman of Economics at George Mason University
Angelo Codevilla – political scientist, author, member of Select Committee on Intelligence of the United States Senate
James C. Conwell – mechanical engineer, president of Rose-Hulman Institute of Technology

Past presidents
 Isaac Conrad Ketler (1876–1913)
 Alexander T. Ormond (1913–1915)
 Weir Carlyle Ketler (1916–1956)
 John Stanley Harker (1956–1971)
 Charles Sherrard Mackenzie (1971–1991)
 Jerry H. Combee (1991–1995)
 John H. Moore (1996–2003)
 Richard G. Jewell J.D. (2004–2014)
 Paul McNulty (2014–present)

References

Further reading

External links

 
 Official athletics website
 The Lee Edwards papers is open at the Hoover Institution Archives and contains his research on Grove City College.

 
Educational institutions established in 1876
Universities and colleges in Mercer County, Pennsylvania
1876 establishments in Pennsylvania
Nondenominational Christian universities and colleges in the United States
Liberal arts colleges in Pennsylvania
Private universities and colleges in Pennsylvania